This page lists the winners and nominees for the Soul Train Music Award for Best R&B/Soul Album – Female. The award was retired during the 2007 ceremony, but during its awarding it has had several names including Best R&B/Urban Contemporary Album – Female, Album of the Year – Female and Best Album – Female. Mary J. Blige has won the most awards in this category, with a total of four.

Winners and nominees
Winners are listed first and highlighted in bold.

1980s

1990s

2000s

See also

 List of music awards honoring women

References

Soul Train Music Awards
Music awards honoring women
Awards established in 1987
Awards disestablished in 2007
Album awards